Fox News Update is an American news program hosted by Shepard Smith, Carley Shimkus, and Ed Henry that premiered on July 16, 2018 on Facebook Watch. The show is broadcast daily at 6:00 AM and weekdays at 4:00 PM ET. Smith reports during weekday afternoons, Shimkus during weekday mornings, and Henry on weekend mornings.

Premise
The show focuses on "up-to-the minute breaking news and the most compelling stories of the day."

Production
On February 12, 2018, it was announced that Facebook was developing a news section within its streaming service Facebook Watch  to feature breaking news stories. The news section was set to be overseen by Facebook's head of news partnerships Campbell Brown.

On June 6, 2018, it was announced that Facebook's first slate of partners for their news section on Facebook Watch would include Fox News. The news program the two companies developed was revealed to be hosted by Shepard Smith, Carley Shimkus, and Abby Huntsman and titled Fox News Update.

On July 13, 2018, it was announced that the show would premiere on July 16, 2018 and broadcast on weekdays at 6:00 AM ET on weekday and weekend mornings and 4:00 PM on weekday afternoons.

Reception
The Verges Patricia Hernandez noted the frequency in which episodes of the series were set to stream ahead of its premiere and interpreted this as an attempt by Facebook to appease Republican politicians who had questioned the company's executives over an alleged liberal bias.

References

External links

Facebook Watch original programming
2010s American television news shows
2020s American television news shows
2018 American television series debuts